Events in the year 1380 in Norway.

Incumbents
Monarch: Haakon VI; then Olaf IV Haakonsson (along with Margaret)

Events
29 July - Olav IV becomes King of Norway, following the death of his father, Haakon VI. This is regarded as the start of the 400 Years of Darkness in Norway.

Arts and literature

Births

Deaths
Haakon VI of Norway, king (born 1340).

References

Norway